Neighboring Sounds (Portuguese: O Som ao Redor) is a 2012 Brazilian drama film directed and written by Kleber Mendonça Filho, produced by Emilie Lesclaux and starring Irandhir Santos, Gustavo Jahn and Maeve Jinkings.

The film was screened at the International Film Festival Rotterdam and was released nationally on January 4, 2013. It was selected as the Brazilian submission for best foreign language film at the 86th Academy Awards, but was not nominated. New York Times film critic Anthony Oliver Scott named it one of the top films of 2012.

Plot
Life in a middle-class neighbourhood in present-day Recife takes an unexpected turn after the arrival of an independent private security firm. The presence of these men brings a sense of safety, but also a good deal of anxiety, to a culture which runs on fear. Meanwhile, Bia (Maeve Jinkings), married and a mother of two, must find a way to deal with the constant barking and howling of her neighbour's dog.

Cast

 Irandhir Santos as Clodoaldo
 Gustavo Jahn as João
 Maeve Jinkings as Bia
 W.J. Solha as Francisco
 Irma Brown as Sofia
 Lula Terra as Anco
 Yuri Holanda as Dinho
 Clébia Souza as Luciene
 Albert Tenório as Ronaldo
 Nivaldo Nascimento as Fernando
 Felipe Bandeira as Nelson
 Clara Pinheiro de Oliveira as Fernanda
 Sebastião Formiga as Claudio
 Mauricéia Conceição as Mariá

Production
Neighboring Sounds is the first fiction feature film from director Kleber Mendonça Filho, who had previously directed the documentary Critical. Recife and Zona da Mata in Pernambuco serve as a backdrop for the dialogue of the actors, being recorded in July and August 2010 for 6 weeks and 3 days. The period of editing the film took two years to complete, and also a long time to hit Brazilian theaters, just released nationally on January 4, 2013, with distribution by Vitrine Filmes. Written in 2008, the screenplay was awarded by the Hubert Bals Fund, from Rotterdam Film Festival, where the film made its world premiere. The screenplay was also awarded in bidding by Petrobras and the Government of Pernambuco.

Critical reception
One of the most acclaimed Brazilian films in 2012, Neighbouring Sounds received overwhelmingly positive reviews; film review aggregator Rotten Tomatoes reports that 92% of critics gave the film a positive review based on 36 reviews, with an average score of 7.8/10. On Metacritic, which assigns a normalised rating out of 100 based on reviews from critics, the film has a score of 77 (citing "generally favourable reviews") based on 9 reviews.

Critic A. O. Scott from The New York Times names as one of the world's top 10 movies made in 2012. Caetano Veloso, in his column in the newspaper O Globo, called it "one of the best films made recently in the world." Robert Abele from Los Angeles Times emphasizes it as "remarkable" and "breathtaking". Tom Dawson of Total Film gave it four of five stars, saying that Filho "reveals a society haunted by both its past and by the threat of future violence", while David Parkinson from Empire also praises the director, calling his film "a hugely impressive debut feature".

President of Brazil Dilma Rousseff, in her Twitter account, said to be happy with the film's submission to the 86th Academy Awards, stating it's a "beautiful film". The president also recommended Neighbouring Sounds to her followers, considering the film "a chronicle of today's Recife".

Accolades

See also
 List of submissions to the 86th Academy Awards for Best Foreign Language Film
 List of Brazilian submissions for the Academy Award for Best Foreign Language Film

References

External links
 
 
 

2012 films
Brazilian drama films
Films shot in Recife
2012 drama films
Best Picture APCA Award winners
Films directed by Kleber Mendonça Filho
Films set in Recife
2012 directorial debut films
2010s Portuguese-language films